Abra is a genus of saltwater clams, marine bivalve mollusks in the family Semelidae. Members of this genus are mostly under 1.5 centimeters long, and have thin shells which are usually white. These bivalves normally live under the surface of sandy and muddy sediments, in the neritic zone.

They are considered an important food source for flat fish.

Species
Species within the genus Abra include:
Abra aequalis (Say, 1822)
Abra alba  (Wood W., 1802)  
Abra californica Kundsen, 1970
Abra lioica (Dall, 1881)
Abra longicallis Sacchi, 1836
Abra nitida (O. F. Mueller, 1776)
Abra pacifica Dall, 1915
Abra prismatica
Abra profundorum E. A. Smith, 1885
Abra segmentum (Récluz, 1843)
Abra tenuis (Montagu, 1818)
Abra tepocana Dall, 1915

References

 

Semelidae
Bivalve genera